Life Between the Exit Signs is the first jazz album by pianist Keith Jarrett as a leader. It was recorded on May 4, 1967 at Atlantic Recording Studios, in New York City and released on April 1, 1968, under the record label Vortex, a subsidiary label of Atlantic Records. It is the first session featuring Jarrett, bassist Charlie Haden and drummer Paul Motian together. In 1999, Collectables Records reissued the album paired with Jarrett's El Juicio (The Judgement), and in 2004 Atlantic Records reissued it along with extensive liner notes by Professor Bill Dobbins.

The tracks are quite influenced by the music of Ornette Coleman and Bill Evans, Jarrett having long been an admirer of both, Haden having played with Coleman (1959–60) and Motian having played with Evans (1959–64). "Margot" is an homage to Jarrett's wife.

Background and making of
As stated by Bill Dobbins on the 2004 reissue liner notes:

Original Liner notes (1968) 
Excerpts from Jarrett's notes on the original Vortex 1968 issue include:

Reception

John Kelman at All About Jazz stated that Life Between the Exit Signs is a "straightforward session that (..) ultimately succeeds as a consistent document of where Jarrett came from and who he was ultimately to become (..) a remarkable first outing from a pianist who has inarguably become as important as his sources, moving the tradition forward while at the same time maintaining a clear reverence for it."

In a review for AllMusic, Jim Todd wrote: "Haden rumbles, throbs, and drones, marvelously lost in bass reverie. Motian has begun to transcend traditional ideas about tempo and to extract absolutely remarkable sounds from his kit. With brushes alone, his sonic palette includes frantic, flapping, prehistoric birds caught in drain pipes and 60-pound bags of sand pelting into banks of fresh snow. In a program of originals and one standard, Jarrett feeds off his partners with strategies informed by key influences from Bill Evans to Cecil Taylor."

The authors of the Penguin Guide to Jazz Recordings stated that, in comparison with Jarrett's later "Standards Trio" recordings, "it is immediately apparent how much more straightforwardly rhythmic Jarrett sounds in 1967, but as yet how uncomfortably co-ordinated he is with the group." They continued: "'Lisbon Stomp' is a cracking opener. The two tunes called 'Love No. 1 and No. 2' are extremely individual and 'Life..." itself has the distinctive jazz/pop/country feel one associates with Jarrett. What is as yet unformed is his ability to shape a group as if it were a single instrument compounded of different personalities."

Writing for London Jazz News, Mike Collins commented: "Listening to the first notes of 'Lisbon Stomp'... is startling. The... track seems now like quintessential Jarrett with a hint of a boppish turn in the melodic phrase, an exuberant rocky flourish to resolve the harmony and slivery, fluid runs launching the improvisation. Somehow, the sound from a slightly dead sounding piano is unmistakably his. It's as if he emerged fully formed with a distinct voice at the very beginning of his long career."

Track listing
All songs written by Keith Jarrett, unless otherwise noted.

 "Lisbon Stomp" - 6:06
 "Love No. 1" - 6:17
 "Love No. 2" - 4:32
 "Everything I Love" (Cole Porter) - 4:33
 "Margot" - 3:45
 "Long Time Gone (But Not Withdrawn)" - 4:55
 "Life Between the Exit Signs" - 6:53
 "Church Dreams" - 6:17

Personnel
Keith Jarrett - piano
Charlie Haden - double-bass
Paul Motian - drums

References 

1968 debut albums
Keith Jarrett albums
Post-bop albums
Vortex Records albums
Atlantic Records albums